Golibaje (in Tulu) or Mangalore bajji (in Kannada) is an Indian fried food made from various flours and curd. In Tulu Nadu region, it is known as golibaje. Other names for the dish include Mangalore baje. This is widely famous in Andhra Pradesh and Telangana as Mysore bonda/bajji.

Ingredients

The main ingredients used to make Mangalore bajji include maida, curd, gram flour, rice flour, chopped onion, coriander leaves, coconut, jeera, green chillies, curry leaves, and salt. The ingredients are thoroughly mixed to form a hard batter, then shaped into a small ball and deep fried, preferably in coconut oil. It is often served with chutney.

Serving 

The dish is usually served warm with coconut chutney 
.

See also 
Punugulu
Bonda

References

Karnataka cuisine
Indian snack foods
Mangalorean cuisine